A Biography is John Mellencamp's second released album (third recorded), and last credited to his then-stage name "Johnny Cougar." Recorded in London, it was released in the UK and Australia by Riva Records on March 6, 1978.

Due to poor sales of Mellencamp's debut album, Chestnut Street Incident, A Biography did not receive a U.S. release upon its 1978 debut. Two of its tracks, "Taxi Dancer" and the single "I Need a Lover," were also included on his 1979 album John Cougar, which was released in the U.S.

In Australia, however, "I Need a Lover" became a Top 10 hit, giving Mellencamp his first taste of success. The song would eventually crack the Top 40 in the U.S. in late 1979 when released as a single from his John Cougar album. AllMusic reviewer Stephen Thomas Erlewine described "I Need a Lover" as Mellencamp's "first good song."

A Biography, along with all Mellencamp's other Riva Records/Mercury Records albums, were remastered and re-released in 2005, marking the first time A Biography was released in the United States.

Mellencamp has often spoken negatively about his early albums, and A Biography is no exception. He stated in Tim Holmes’ 1986 biography: “A Biography is so bitter. I mean I don’t even like to listen to it. I can’t believe it’s me. The songs were written in ’76 or ’77. The lyrics were real awful. They were real ‘I hate you. I hate this.’ And that’s the way I felt at that time."

Track listing

Personnel 
 Johnny Cougar – lead vocals, acoustic guitar, background vocals
 Brian BecVar – keyboards, background vocals
 Larry Crane – guitars, background vocals
 Robert "Ferd" Frank – bass, background vocals
 Tom Knowles – drums, background vocals
 Andy Mackay – saxophones
 Ann Odell – string arrangement on "Taxi Dancer"
David Steen – photography

References 

John Mellencamp

1978 albums
John Mellencamp albums
Albums produced by John Punter
Riva Records albums